The 2022 FineMark Women's Pro Tennis Championship was a professional tennis tournament played on outdoor clay courts. It was the third edition of the tournament which was part of the 2022 ITF Women's World Tennis Tour. It took place in Bonita Springs, Florida, United States between 2 and 8 May 2022.

Singles main draw entrants

Seeds

 1 Rankings are as of 25 April 2022.

Other entrants
The following players received wildcards into the singles main draw:
  Ellie Douglas
  Fanny Norin
  Whitney Osuigwe
  Sachia Vickery

The following players received entry from the qualifying draw:
  Tímea Babos
  Gabriela Cé
  Sophie Chang
  Kayla Day
  Gabriela Lee
  Sonya Macavei
  Tara Moore
  Chanelle Van Nguyen

Champions

Singles

  Gabriela Lee def.  Katarzyna Kawa, 6–1, 6–3

Doubles

  Tímea Babos /  Nao Hibino def.  Olga Govortsova /  Katarzyna Kawa, 6–4, 3–6, [10–7]

References

External links
 2022 FineMark Women's Pro Tennis Championship at ITFtennis.com
 Official website

2022 ITF Women's World Tennis Tour
2022 in American tennis
May 2022 sports events in the United States